Kim O'Brien was an American actress active from 1974 to 1987. She played a variety of roles in movies and television shows.

Filmography

References

External links
 
 Kim O'Brien: Credits at TV Guide

American film actresses
American television actresses
20th-century American actresses
Year of birth missing (living people)
Place of birth missing (living people)
Living people
21st-century American women